Saifullah Khan Paracha (Urdu: سیف اللہ خان پراچہ; born 17 July 1931 – 14 July 2021) was a Pakistani professional engineer, businessman and politician from Balochistan.

Personal life

Saifullah was born on 17 July 1931 in Makhad, Attock district, Balochistan, Pakistan. After Completing his senior Cambridge from Aitchison, he left for United States and completed B.S. Engineering, Mechanical and Mining Engineering from the University of California, Berkeley California, USA in 1954.

He was also President of Dar ul Falah, orphanage, Anjuman-e-Islamia, Quetta, NGO and Pakistan Institution of Engineers Balochistan.

Early eocene quettacyon parachai (condylarthra) from the ghazij formation of balochistan is named after him.

Political career
During his political career, Saifullah Khan Paracha, served as a member of Municipal Corporation Quetta, West Pakistan Assembly, Balochistan Assembly and Senate of Pakistan.

References

1931 births
2021 deaths
Pakistani politicians